Corus lesnei is a species of beetle in the family Cerambycidae. It was described by Breuning in 1936.

References

lesnei
Beetles described in 1936